Mount Hope Reservoir is a historic reservoir located in Oneida in Madison County, New York. It includes three contributing sites and four contributing buildings.  It was developed between 1883 and 1906 and served as the original source of water for drinking, fire protection, and industrial needs for Oneida.  It was all but abandoned by the city in 1979.

It was listed on the National Register of Historic Places in 1997.

The  reservoir property is now a city park, and features hiking trails, fishing, mountain biking, cross-country skiing, and camping.

References

External links
 Mount Hope Reservoir - City of Oneida Parks and Recreation

Buildings and structures on the National Register of Historic Places in New York (state)
Reservoirs in New York (state)
Parks in Madison County, New York
Oneida, New York
Reservoirs in Madison County, New York
National Register of Historic Places in Madison County, New York